Charles J. Otto (born February 15, 1964, in Salisbury, Maryland) is an American politician. He is a Republican member of the Maryland House of Delegates representing district 38A, based in Somerset and Worcester Counties, Maryland.

Early life
Otto was born on February 15, 1964, in Salisbury, Maryland. He attended Washington High School in Princess Anne, Maryland, the University of Maryland Eastern Shore, and Virginia Polytechnic Institute and State University, where he earned a B.S. in animal science in 1986. He previously worked as a sales representative and crop consultant for various organizations, including the William B. Tilghman Co. and the Maryland Farm Bureau, from 1987 to 1995.

In the legislature
Otto was elected to the House of Delegates in the 2010 General Assembly elections, succeeding Carolyn J. Elmore. He has served as the Deputy Minority Whip for the Maryland House Republican Caucus since 2013, and as the House Chair of the Somerset County Delegation since 2011. He was also a member of the Eastern Shore Delegation from 2015 to 2018.

Otto has served on the following committees:
 Environment and Transportation Committee, 2015–present (environment subcommittee, 2015–present; natural resources, agriculture & open space subcommittee, 2015–present)
 Protocol Committee, 2015–present
 Environmental Matters Committee, 2011–15 (agriculture, agriculture preservation, & open space subcommittee, 2011–15; natural resources subcommittee, 2011–15)

Electoral history

References

Living people
Republican Party members of the Maryland House of Delegates
21st-century American politicians
1964 births
People from Salisbury, Maryland